"We All Need Love" is a single released by the Italian Eurodance group Double You in 1992.

History
The song was originally written and recorded by Canadian rock musician Domenic Troiano in 1979. It had also been covered by the Australian band Ebony in 1983, and by Karen J. Ann in 1988. The Double You version was recorded in 1992.

It was the band's second single from its debut album, We All Need Love, released the same year, and confirmed the worldwide success of Double You. It peaked at number-one in Belgium and became a Top 10 hit in Austria, France, Germany, Italy, Spain and Switzerland. There were various formats, including many remixes.

The music video of "We All Need Love" was directed by Italian director Giacomo De Simone. De Simone has directed music videos for many other Eurodance acts, like Corona, Ice MC and Whigfield.

Critical reception
Larry Flick from Billboard commented, "After a mediocre showing in the "Please Don't Go" battle against KWS, Italo-pop/house act lunges for crossover radio approval with a cute, retro-minded disco twirler. An anthemic chorus and old-fashioned string and piano fills give the song charm." Andy Beevers from Music Week said the song is "great", adding that "it has a very similar organ-driven poppy disco sound and should give them the success they deserve."

Track listings

Official versions
 Acapella
 Euroremix
 Extended mix
 FBH remix
 Instrumental
 Radio mix
 Sunshine mix
 U.S. club mix / U.S. remix
 U.S. radio edit mix / U.S. radio remix

Credits
 Produced by Robyx
 Written by Domenic Troiano
 Recorded and mixed at Casablanca Recordings, Italy
 Robyx Productions
 Arranged by AWF
 Artwork by Sunrise Studio
 U.S. remixes :
 Engineered by David "db" Benus
 Remixed, produced and edited by Franco Iemmello
 Recorded and mixed at Tatiana Studios, Newark, NJ
 FBH remix by Frankies Beathouse

Charts

Weekly charts

Year-end charts

References

External links

1979 songs
1979 singles
1992 singles
Double You songs
Number-one singles in Belgium
ZYX Music singles
Blanco y Negro Records singles
Music videos directed by Giacomo De Simone